Abeloff's Clinical Oncology is a medical reference work covering the field of oncology. First released in 1995 by Churchill Livingstone, it is currently published by Elsevier.

History 

The first edition, titled Clinical Oncology, was published by Churchill Livingstone in 1995. In 2000, a second edition was released with an extra chapter on cancer prevention and screening. A third edition was released four years later with more updates over the previous edition.

Its founding editor, Martin Abeloff, died in 2007. The book is currently in its sixth edition.

Reception 
Abeloff's Clinical Oncology has been described as a "recognized comprehensive oncology reference work", and one of the "most recognizable" oncology textbooks.

References 

Medical manuals